Viktors Morozs (born 30 July 1980) is a Latvian football coach and former player (midfielder). He is currently the manager of Latvian Higher League side, RFS.

Club career 
Morozs started his career in Valmiera. Between 2001 and 2008 he played in 122 matches for Skonto Riga and scored 15 goals. On 3 August 2008 he signed for two years with Bulgarian champions CSKA Sofia. In summer 2010 he was released from the team, and after a 2 months long period of being in a free agent's status, he signed a single-year contract with Atromitos Yeroskipou, playing in the Cypriot Second Division. In 2011 Morozs moved to the Cypriot Second Division club PAEEK. Before the start of the 2012 season he returned to Latvia, joining the Latvian Higher League club Spartaks Jūrmala. As the club's captain, during 2 seasons Morozs played 37 league matches and scored 5 goals. In July 2013 he was released. In August 2013 Morozs joined the Belarusian Premier League club Naftan Novopolotsk. In March 2014 the Latvian Higher League club Skonto Rīga announced the signing of Viktors Morozs, as he returned to the club he had already played for from 2001 to 2008.

International career

Morozs made his debut for Latvia in a friendly match against Azerbaijan on 6 July 2002. He has played 22 international matches, scoring no goals. In October 2014 Morozs was recalled to the national team for the EURO 2016 qualification matches against Iceland and Turkey for the first time since March 2007.

By seasons

* - played games and goals

Honours
Skonto FC
 Latvian Higher League (5): 2000, 2001, 2002, 2003, 2004
 Latvian Cup (3): 2000, 2001, 2002

References

External links

1980 births
Living people
People from Vangaži
Latvian footballers
Latvia international footballers
Latvian expatriate footballers
Expatriate footballers in Bulgaria
Expatriate footballers in Cyprus
Expatriate footballers in Belarus
First Professional Football League (Bulgaria) players
Cypriot Second Division players
Skonto FC players
PFC CSKA Sofia players
Atromitos Yeroskipou players
PAEEK players
FK Spartaks Jūrmala players
FC Naftan Novopolotsk players
Association football midfielders
Latvian football managers
FK RFS managers